John Robert Devereux (born 8 February 1946 in Queenstown, Tasmania), was an Australian Labor Party, and later independent, Senator for Tasmania from 1987 to 1996.

He was first nominated to fill the casual vacancy caused by the resignation of Don Grimes in April 1987. However, his nomination was rejected by a tied vote in the Tasmanian Parliament. As one Tasmanian Minister (Ray Groom) argued: "we can choose only a person who is a member of the same party ... but we are not bound to accept the nomination of the party concerned". Following a double dissolution of the Commonwealth Parliament, Devereux was elected at the election of 11 July 1987.

From 24 to 27 January 1994, thirty protesters from the Tasmanian Wilderness Society (TWS) blockaded Riveaux Road in the Picton Valley in Tasmania to prevent logging of woodland. At the blockade, Senator Devereux announced his resignation from the ALP in protest against its policies on forest issues.

Devereux served out the rest of his term, from 1994 until 1996, as an independent Senator.

He lives in Tasmania with his wife Glynis. His three children, all married, also live in Tasmania.  He is currently the CEO of the Tasmanian Pacing Club.

References

1946 births
Living people
Australian Labor Party members of the Parliament of Australia
Independent members of the Parliament of Australia
Members of the Australian Senate for Tasmania
Members of the Australian Senate
20th-century Australian politicians